Beyond the Clouds is a 2014 South Korean television series starring Yoon Kye-sang, Han Ji-hye and Cho Jin-woong. It aired on KBS2 from February 17 to April 14, 2014 on Mondays and Tuesdays at 21:55 for 16 episodes.

Plot
Jung Se-ro (Yoon Kye-sang) is a hardworking young man who works multiple part-time jobs while studying for the foreign civil service exam. His father is a petty criminal and a con man, and their family lives a transient life because of his deals, currently staying in Thailand.

Despite wanting an honest life for himself, Se-ro's dreams are shattered on the night of a glamorous jewel exhibition opening in Bangkok. His father dies in an incident involving stolen diamonds, and because Se-ro was at the scene when another man was shot, he is accused and arrested for murder. After spending five years in a Thai prison, upon his release he takes up a new identity and becomes a con man just like his father. He joins a ring of jewel smugglers led by Park Kang-jae (Cho Jin-woong), with whom he shares a brotherly bond. Kang-Jae was raised like a son by Se-ro's father, who taught him all the tricks of the trade. But Kang-Jae has harbored a lifelong jealousy towards the real son, which is stoked further when the woman he loves, smuggling accomplice Seo Jae-in (Kim Yoo-ri) also falls for Se-ro.

Then Se-ro meets Han Young-won (Han Ji-hye), the cold-hearted heiress to a jewelry brand. She was madly in love with her fiancé Gong Woo-jin (Song Jong-ho), and had closed herself off after his death. But Se-ro draws her out into the world, while Young-won gives him a reason to live when he had all but given up. They fall in love, not knowing that the man Se-ro was accused of killing had been Young-won's fiancé. His love for her becomes his punishment, but also his salvation.

Cast
Yoon Kye-sang as Jung Se-ro
Han Ji-hye as Han Young-won
Cho Jin-woong as Park Kang-jae
 Park Joon-mok as young Kang-jae
Kim Yoo-ri as Seo Jae-in
Lee Dae-yeon as Jung Do-joon, Se-ro's father
Jung Won-joong as Shin Pil-do
Kim Young-ok as Hong Soon-ok
Lee Jae-won as Hong 
Woo Hyun as Hama
Kim Yoon-sung as Cha Pyo 
Song Jong-ho as Gong Woo-jin, Young-won's fiancé
Kim Yeong-cheol as Han Tae-oh, Young-won's father
Jeon Mi-seon as Baek Nan-joo, Young-won's stepmother
Son Ho-jun as Han Young-joon, Young-won's half brother
Kim Sun-kyung as Section chief Min
Ahn Ji-hyun as Kang Han-na
Song Young-kyu as Kang Hak-soo
Lee Sang-hoon as Secretary Ahn
Cho Seung-hee as Jewelry saleswoman (cameo)

Ratings
In the table below,  represent the lowest ratings and  represent the highest ratings.

References

External links
  
 
 
 

2014 South Korean television series debuts
2014 South Korean television series endings
Korean Broadcasting System television dramas
Korean-language television shows
South Korean romance television series
South Korean melodrama television series
Television series by Celltrion Entertainment